Famous Last Words is the twelfth studio album by Al Stewart, released in September 1993.

Track listing
All tracks composed by Al Stewart; except where indicated

"Feel Like" – 3:35
"Angel of Mercy" – 3:51
"Don't Forget Me" – 5:21 (Stewart, Peter White)
"Peter on the White Sea" – 3:37 (Stewart, David Pack, Andrew Powell)
"Genie on a Table Top" – 3:47
"Trespasser" – 4:45 (Stewart, Peter White)
"Trains" – 8:17
"Necromancer" – 3:40
"Charlotte Corday" – 3:47 (Stewart, Tori Amos)
"Hipposong" – 1:52
"Night Rolls In" – 4:35

The 2006 EMI re-release has the following additional tracks:

"In the Dark" – 4:58
"Blow Your Mansion Down" – 4:55
"Mixed Blessing" – 2:54

The 2007 Collector's Choice re-release has the following additional tracks:

"The Coldest Winter in Memory" – 5:50
"Blow Your Mansion Down" – 4:57
"In the Dark" – 4:58

References

1993 albums
Al Stewart albums